Tales from the Mos Eisley Cantina (1995) is an anthology of short stories set in the fictional Star Wars universe. The book is edited by Kevin J. Anderson. It is based on characters seen in the Mos Eisley cantina, a shady bar filled with aliens that was first shown in the 1977 film Star Wars.

In 1996, Dark Horse Comics released a similarly titled, but not directly related, one-shot comic titled Tales from Mos Eisley.

Contents

Reception
Scott at TheForce.Net gave the book 3.5 out of 4. He praised the variety of the stories, highlighted the story by Timothy Zahn, and a few others, but found it repetitive how the same few scenes from the film appeared in every story. He concluded: "All of these stories were fun, action packed, and very entertaining, not to mention they had a much greater impact on the Star Wars Universe than you might think! I consider this a must read." Michael Wolff of Starlog Magazine liked the idea but found it wore thin after a while. Of the sixteen stories, he said only a few stood out and praised "Nightlily" by Barbara Hambly and "Soup's On" by Jennifer Robertson, in particular. He concluded "For die-hard Star Wars enthusiasts only."

See also 
 Tales from Jabba's Palace
 Tales of the Bounty Hunters
 Tales from the Empire

References

External links

External links 
 Amazon.com Listing
 Official CargoBay Listing

1995 anthologies
Star Wars Legends
Works edited by Kevin J. Anderson
Science fiction anthologies
1990s science fiction works
Bantam Spectra books